The following countries conducted a census of the general population in 2000:

 Fifth National Population Census of the People's Republic of China
 Costa Rica 2000 Census, the ninth federal census, conducted at irregular intervals
 2000 Estonia Census
 Indonesia 2000 census
 2000 Panamanian census
 2000 Turkish census
 2000 United States Census, the 22nd decennial federal census